Litchfield High School is a high school in Litchfield, Connecticut, United States. It is a part of Litchfield Public Schools.

Litchfield High currently enrolls students from Bantam, Northfield, East Litchfield, and Litchfield. The school gym, designed by Marcel Breuer, is currently featured on the Smithsonian's website for its unique architecture.

On June 29, 2022, Warren, Morris, Goshen and Litchfield voted to merge their school systems, creating a new Region 20. The Litchfield High School building will serve as the Middle School (Grades 6-8) for the new region, when it begins in 2025.

References 

Public high schools in Connecticut
Schools in Litchfield County, Connecticut
Litchfield, Connecticut